Sorgono is a comune (municipality) in the Province of Nuoro in the Italian region Sardinia, located about  north of Cagliari and about  southwest of Nuoro.

Sorgono borders the following municipalities: Atzara, Austis, Belvì, Neoneli, Ortueri, Samugheo, Tiana, Tonara.

The novelist D. H. Lawrence visited Sorgono in 1921 and described the town and its inhabitants in Chapter 5 of Sea and Sardinia.

Demographic evolution

Notable Resident
Giovanni Melis Fois- (1916-2009) was born here.
Francesca Barracciu, MEP - born here in 1966

References

Cities and towns in Sardinia